The International Council on Large Electric Systems (CIGRE) is a global nonprofit organisation in the field of high voltage electricity. It was founded in Paris, France in 1921.  The scope of its activities include the technical and economical aspects of the electrical grid, as well as the environmental and regulatory aspects.

More specifically, the objectives of CIGRE are to:
facilitate technical exchanges among those involved in the production, transmission, and distribution of electrical energy;
communicate the state of the art and the technical knowledge in these fields;
inform the decision makers and regulators in the field of high voltage electricity by means of publication in its magazine Electra or through the organisation of biennial conferences, named Sessions, that take place in even years in Paris, France.

CIGRE membership is open to individuals, companies and organisations involved with any aspect of high voltage engineering.  Member organisations and companies are known as collective members.

Organisation 

The activities of CIGRE are divided into sixteen Study Committees (SCs):
A1 - Rotating Electrical Machines
A2 - Transformers
A3 - High Voltage Equipment
B1 - Insulated Cables
B2 - Overhead Lines
B3 - Substations
B4 - HVDC and Power Electronics
B5 - Protection and Automation
C1 - System Development and Economics
C2 - System Operation and Control
C3 - System Environmental Performance
C4 - System Technical Performance
C5 - Electricity Markets and Regulation
C6 - Distribution Systems and Dispersed Generation
D1 - Materials and Emerging Test Techniques
D2 - Information Systems and Telecommunication

In addition, there are 61 National Committees of CIGRE (NCs), which support the Study Committees in identifying experts to participate in working groups. Beginning with the United Kingdom, Netherlands and Italy in 1923, National Committees have developed progressively around the world to give CIGRE a global footprint. In 2014, the Turkish National Committee was established.

Activities 
CIGRE organises several types of conference, of which the biennial Sessions, which take place in Paris in even-numbered years, are the most important and broad-ranging.  The first CIGRE session took place on 21–28 November 1921 at 7 Rue de Madrid, Paris, and was attended by 231 high voltage engineers and technicians. Since then, sessions have been held every two years, except during World War II and in 2020 when there was an outbreak of the coronavirus 2019 (COVID-19) worldwide.

The 48th CIGRE session was held in August 2020 for the first time via the internet due to restrictions on travel placed by many countries as a result of the COVID-19 pandemic. It was, therefore, called an e-Session. Whereas the 47th session held at the Palais des Congrès de in Paris attracted 8500 people in total, the e-Session attracted about 1500 live attendances on each day and many offline registrations. The CIGRE Session and its Technical Exhibition bring together more than 8500 senior executives, engineers and experts from the worldwide Power Industry.

In parallel of the Session, a Technical Exhibition is held in the same location on levels 1, 2 and 3. The exhibition offers the opportunity to all visitors, including CIGRE delegates, to discover new services, tools, equipment and materials as well as the most advanced technologies in the field of power systems.

In addition to the biennial sessions, CIGRE organises several other types of conferences in locations other than Paris, including: 
 Symposia in odd-numbered years.  These usually involve a sub-set of the study committees and concentrate on one common theme.
 Regional conferences covering a variety of subjects but for one specific country or region 
 Colloquia which usually involve only one or two study committees.

The Study Committees of CIGRE appoint Working Groups of experts to investigate and publish the state of the art in their chosen field.  The output of Working Groups is in the form of Technical Brochures.  Technical Brochures are frequently used to inform and act as precursor documents for the activities of national and international Standards organisations, notably the International Electrotechnical Commission (IEC).

Resources 
CIGRE creates technical resources that are made available to non-members either freely or for a fee, and to members freely. These include the bimonthly flagship digital magazine Electra, conference proceedings, GREEN BOOKS, Technical Brochures (TBs) and webinars. TBs are a summary of the work of a Working Group.

Electra contains executive summaries of recently published Technical Brochures, as well as selected scientific papers and invited papers.

GREEN BOOKS are a repository of knowledge in a specific subject area and are useful as reference material.

The Technical Committee of CIGRE recently updated the CIGRE White Paper “Network of the Future” issued in 2011 and published in Electra (N°256). This summary paper provides CIGRE’s views on the know-how needed to manage the transition towards future energy supply systems].

List of National Committees 

The principle of National Committees came about in 1931 when they were made official. The following table shows a list of National Committees of CIGRE, year they first joined, and their membership numbers:

References

External links

1921 establishments in France
Electric power distribution
Electrical engineering organizations
Organizations based in Paris
Scientific organizations established in 1921